Nguyễn Phi Khanh (born Nguyễn Ứng Long) was a scholar of Hanlin Academy. He was also father of well-known person Nguyễn Trãi. His hometown was Chí Linh District, Hải Dương. He was Doctor of Philosophy in Trần Duệ Tông age but was not appointed to any official position. When Hồ Quý Ly usurped the throne, he was promoted as a scholar of Hanlin Academy.

References

Bibliography

Date of birth unknown
Date of death unknown
Vietnamese scholars
14th-century Vietnamese poets
Hồ dynasty poets